The fourth season of Family Matters, an American family sitcom created by William Bickley and Michael Warren, premiered on ABC in the U.S. on September 18, 1992, and concluded on May 14, 1993. Shawn Harrison who played Waldo Faldo became part of the main cast this season.  The character Myra Monkhouse played by Michelle Thomas debuted.  This was the last season as part of the main cast for Jaimee Foxworth who played Judy Winslow and for Telma Hopkins who played Rachael Crawford.  John Tracy and Gary Menteer directed most of the episodes. Telma Hopkins doesn’t appear in as much episodes this season as she did the previous three seasons due to her getting her own sitcom.

Synopsis
Steve Urkel continues to be the well-intentioned, annoying nerd that still lives next door to the Winslow clan.  Urkel continues to get himself into predicaments causing the Winslow's grief such as taking a feud with Carl to American Gladiators or causing him stress leading to health changes.  His unrequited love for Laura is a strong as ever, but gets into his first serious relationship with Myra Monkhouse.

Cast

Main cast

 Reginald VelJohnson as Carl Winslow
 Jo Marie Payton as Harriette Winslow
 Rosetta LeNoire as Estelle Winslow
 Darius McCrary as Eddie Winslow
 Kellie Shanygne Williams as Laura Winslow
 Jaimee Foxworth as Judy Winslow
 Bryton McClure as Richie Crawford
 Shawn Harrison as Waldo Faldo
 Jaleel White as Steve Urkel
 Telma Hopkins as Rachel Crawford

Recurring cast
 Cherie Johnson as Maxine Johnson
 Michelle Thomas as Myra Monkhouse
 Shavar Ross as Alex "Weasel" Park
 Patrick J. Dancy as Ted Curran

Guest stars
 Mike Adamle as himself
 Larry Csonka as himself
 Lynn "Red" Williams as Sabre
 Galen Tomlinson as Turbo

Episodes

References

1992 American television seasons
1993 American television seasons